Nebria assidua is a species of ground beetle in the Nebriinae subfamily that is endemic to Nepal.

References

assidua
Beetles described in 2009
Beetles of Asia
Endemic fauna of Nepal